Peter Stubbs is a leading New Zealand marketing lawyer and the head of the Sports, Entertainment and Marketing practice of Simpson Grierson. He is the legal counsel for The New Zealand Marketing Association , the Direct Selling Association of New Zealand  and a bi-monthly columnist for New Zealand's Marketing Magazine  since 1995.

Stubbs' other clients include Kellogg, George Weston Foods, Amway, Netball NZ and Yachting NZ among others.

Stubbs is currently Deputy Chairman of The Edge Performing Arts & Convention Centre and until 2007, deputy chairman of Tourism New Zealand. Stubbs was a long-term member (1991-2006) and then chairman (2001-2006) of the Hamilton City Council Events Sponsorship Subcommittee. Stubbs is also a founding member and was later president of the New Zealand Events and Sponsorship Association.

He was secondary educated at Mount Albert Grammar School where he was Dux before graduating with an LLB (Hons).   Stubbs is a member of the Institute of Directors, Stubbs holds a Certificate in Company Direction from the Institute and a Certificate in the Fundamentals of Management from Columbia Business School.

References

Living people
People from Auckland
New Zealand businesspeople
20th-century New Zealand lawyers
People educated at Mount Albert Grammar School
Columbia Business School alumni
Year of birth missing (living people)
21st-century New Zealand lawyers